Balandin is a Russian surname. Notable people with the surname include:

Aleksei Balandin (1898–1967), Russian/Soviet chemist
Aleksandr Nikolayevich Balandin (born 1953), Russian cosmonaut
Aleksandr Balandin (born 1989), Russian Olympic gymnast
Alexander A. Balandin, Russian electrical engineer
Dmitriy Balandin (born 1995), Kazakh Olympic swimmer
Lev Balandin (1934–1980), Russian swimmer
Mikhail Balandin, (1980–2011) Russian Ice-hockey defenceman

Russian-language surnames